Niederweimar station is a railway station in the Niederweimar district of Marburg-Biedenkopf in the Gießen administrative region in Hesse, Germany.

References

Railway stations in Hesse
Buildings and structures in Marburg-Biedenkopf